The Martin Beck Award is an award given by the Swedish Crime Writers' Academy (Svenska Deckarakademin) for the best crime novel in translation. It is one of the most prestigious international crime-writing awards.
The Award is named after Martin Beck, a fictional Swedish police detective who is the main character in a series of ten novels by Maj Sjöwall (1935–2020) and Per Wahlöö (1926–1975).

Winners
The country and year of the first publication in brackets.

1970s
 1971 – Julian Symons, The 31st of February,  (UK, 1950)
 1972 – Frederick Forsyth, The Day of the Jackal,  (UK, 1971)
 1973 – Richard Neely, The Walter Syndrome,  (USA, 1970) 
 1974 – Francis Iles, Malice Aforethought,  (UK, 1931)
 1975 – Cornell Woolrich, Rendezvous in Black,  (USA, 1948)
 1976 – John Franklin Bardin, The Last of Philip Banter, (USA, 1947) and Devil Take The Blue-Tail Fly, (UK, 1948)
 1977 – Leslie Thomas, Dangerous Davies: The Last Detective, (UK, 1976)
 1978 – Anthony Price, Other Paths to Glory, (UK, 1974)
 1979 – Brian Garfield, Recoil, (USA, 1977)

1980s
 1980 – Ruth Rendell, Make Death Love Me, (UK, 1979)
 1981 – Sébastien Japrisot, One Deadly Summer, (L'Été meurtrier, France, 1977)
 1982 – Margaret Yorke, The Scent of Fear, (UK, 1980)
 1983 – Pierre Magnan, Death in the Truffle Wood, (Le Commissaire dans la truffière, France, 1978)
 1984 – Len Deighton, Berlin Game, (UK, 1983)
 1985 – Elmore Leonard, LaBrava, (USA, 1983)
 1986 – John le Carré, A Perfect Spy, (UK, 1986)
 1987 – Matti Joensuu, Harjunpää and the Tormentors, (Harjunpää ja kiusantekijät, Finland, 1986)
 1988 – Scott Turow, Presumed Innocent, (USA, 1987)
 1989 – Anders Bodelsen, Mørklægning, (Denmark, 1988)

1990s
 1990 – Ross Thomas, Chinaman's Chance, (USA, 1978)
 1991 – Doris Gercke, Weinschröter, du musst hängen, (Weinschröter, du musst hängen, Germany, 1988)
 1992 – Manuel Vázquez Montalbán, The Southern Seas, (Spain, 1979)
 1993 – Tim Krabbé, The Golden Egg, (Het gouden ei, Netherlands, 1984) 
 1994 – Maarten 't Hart, Het Woeden der Gehele Wereld, (Netherlands, 1993)
 1995 – Scott Smith, A Simple Plan, (USA, 1993)
 1996 – David Guterson, Snow Falling on Cedars, (USA, 1994)
 1997 – Barry Unsworth, Morality Play, (UK, 1995)
 1998 – Mary Willis Walker, Under the Beetle's Cellar, (USA, 1995)
 1999 – Iain Pears, An Instance of the Fingerpost, (UK, 1997)

2000s
 2000 – Thomas H. Cook, The Chatham School Affair, (USA, 1996)
 2001 – Peter Robinson, In a Dry Season, (USA, 1999) 
 2002 – Karin Fossum, Black Seconds, (Svarte sekunder, Norway, 2002)
 2003 – Ben Elton, Dead Famous, (UK, 2001) 
 2004 – Alexander McCall Smith, The No. 1 Ladies' Detective Agency, (UK, 1998)
 2005 – Arnaldur Indriðason, Voices, (Röddin, Iceland, 2002)
 2006 – Philippe Claudel, Grey Souls, (Les Âmes grises, France, 2003)
 2007 – Thomas H. Cook, Red Leaves, (USA, 2005)
 2008 – Andrea Maria Schenkel, Tannöd, (Germany, 2006)
 2009 – Andrew Taylor, Bleeding Heart Square, (UK, 2008)

2010s
 2010 – Deon Meyer, Devil's Peak, (Infanta, 2004)
 2011 – Denise Mina, The End of the Wasp Season, (2010)
 2012 – Peter Robinson, Before the Poison, (2011)
 2013 – Dror Mishani, The Missing File, (Tik ne'edar, 2011)
 2014 – Jørn Lier Horst, The Hunting Dogs, (Jakthundene, 2012)
 2015 – Nic Pizzolatto, Galveston, (2010)
 2016 – Ray Celestin, The Axeman's Jazz, (2014)
 2017 – Ane Riel, Harpiks, (2015)
 2018 – Thomas Mullen, Darktown, (2016)
 2019 – Jane Harper, The Lost Man, (2018)

2020s
 2020 – Deon Meyer, The Last Hunt, (Prooi, 2019)
 2021 – Guillaume Musso, La jeune fille et la nuit, (2018)

References

External links
 Martin Beck Award official website

Mystery and detective fiction awards
Swedish awards
Translation awards